Amdhi is a small village in Azamgarh district of Uttar Pradesh, India, situated near the Jahanaganj Market.

The name was derived from 'आम (Mango) and दही (Yogurt)', the traditional Indian fruit and food.

It lies 14 km south of Azamgarh city. It is well connected and accessible through Azamgarh city, Varanasi, Jaunpur and Allahabad. It has a high literacy rate. The village has a post office with pin code as 276131 and dispensary run by state government.

Amdhi village is Muslim populated area. The population of village is approx. 300 person according to 2007 population counting. There are several famous personalities in the village. One is Syed Aasiq Hussain. He has five sons: Eldest Syed Ameer Haider, Syed Ali Haider, Syed Sibte Haider, Syed Asfaq Haider, and youngest Syed Nawab Haider. Mr Syed Ameer Haider has five sons: Syed Firoz Haider, Syed Afroz Haider, Syed Mohd Danish, Syed Mohd Arif and Syed Mohd Mohnis..

Villages in Azamgarh district